Baltic Film, Media and Arts School of Tallinn University (BFM) is a film and media school created in 2005 (as Baltic Film and Media School) as a college of Tallinn University, one of the biggest educational institutions in Estonia.

BFM offers a wide-based education in an international environment. The study programmes offer tools and skills for working various positions in film production, TV, new media, communication, choreography, art and music.

BFM provides students with free shooting and post-production equipment, studio space and production support for their creative works, supervised by established professionals from the audiovisual industry.

The school is situated in Tallinn, the capital of Estonia and the European Capital of Culture in 2011.

Programs

BFM offers programs at the Bachelor's, Master's and PhD level in Estonian and English.

BFM Training
BFM Training is the Baltic Film, Media and Arts School's training unit that offers tailor-made trainings and productions that correspond to the profiled needs of clients. Working languages: English, Estonian, Russian, Finnish.

Equipment and Room Rental
BFM offers the opportunity for people and organizations outside the school to rent the school’s shooting equipment and editing rooms for commercial productions. The school has several production and editing rooms for rent: a 161 m² film soundstage, a 112 m² television studio with the service areas, a cinema hall, two sound mixing rooms, 3 sound editing rooms, 8 editing rooms and an 18-seat Apple iMac based computer lab with central SAN media storage. Information about booking.

Notable alumni
 Sass Henno, Estonian screenwriter
 Kullar Viimne, Estonian director, screenwriter and cinematographer
 Erik Norkroos, Estonian filmmaker
 Tanel Toom, Estonian Oscar-nominated director and screenwriter

Notable academic staff
 Tiina Lokk, Estonian filmmaker
 Riho Västrik, Estonian documentarian, journalist and historian
 Taavi Varm, Estonian artist
 Arvo Iho, Estonian cinematographer

References
BFM website

External links
 Tallinn University website

Film schools in Estonia
Educational institutions established in 2005
2005 establishments in Estonia
Education in Tallinn